Matrona may refer to:

Religion
 Matryona Nikonova, known as Matrona of Moscow, a saint of the Russian Orthodox Church
 Matrona of Barcelona, a saint of the Roman Catholic Church, born in Thessaloniki and venerated in Barcelona
 Matrona of Chios, also known as Chiopolitissa, a 15th-century saint of the Orthodox Church, born in the island of Chios, Greece
 Dea Matrona, a singular form of Matronae or Matrones, mother goddesses attested in the Roman era among Celtic and Germanic regions; see Matres and Matrones
 St. Matrona of Perge, A fifth century saint of the Byzantine Church, born in the city of Perge Pamphylia (Asia Minor)

Other
 Matrona, Latin name of the river Marne, France
 Matrona (genus), a genus of damselflies in the family Calopterygidae
 Matrona (Pugad Baboy), a story arc of the Philippine comic strip series Pugad Baboy